The 1975–76 season was FC Dinamo București's 27th season in Divizia A. Dinamo kept up the pace with Steaua in the fight for championship, but in the end had to settle with the second position. The Romanian Cup remained the weak point, Dinamo being again eliminated in the first round. In the European Cup, Dinamo was unlucky, their first opponent being Real Madrid. After a loss in Spain, the win at home was not enough to move in the second round.

Results

European Cup 

First round

Real Madrid CF won 4-2 on aggregate

Squad 

Goalkeepers: Mircea Constantinescu, Constantin Traian Ștefan.

Defenders: Florin Cheran, Augustin Deleanu, Vasile Dobrău, Teodor Lucuță, Gabriel Sandu, Alexandru Sătmăreanu.

Midfielders: Cornel Dinu, Ion Marin, Ion Mateescu, Radu Nunweiller, Cristian Vrînceanu.

Forwards: Ionel Augustin, Alexandru Custov, Florea Dumitrache, Dudu Georgescu, Mircea Lucescu, Marian Vlad, Toma Zamfir.

Transfers 

Alexandru Moldovan is transferred to Jiul Petroşani.

References 
 www.labtof.ro
 www.romaniansoccer.ro

1975
Association football clubs 1975–76 season
Dinamo